Vera Lantratova (11 May 1947 – 19 April 2021) was a Soviet volleyball player for the USSR. She was born in Baku, Azerbaijan SSR. In 1968, as a member of the Soviet Union team, she won a gold medal in Mexico.

References

External links
 

1947 births
2021 deaths
Sportspeople from Baku
Azerbaijani people of Russian descent
Soviet women's volleyball players
Olympic volleyball players of the Soviet Union
Volleyball players at the 1968 Summer Olympics
Azerbaijani women's volleyball players
Olympic medalists in volleyball
Medalists at the 1968 Summer Olympics
Olympic gold medalists for the Soviet Union
Honoured Masters of Sport of the USSR